The Final Jolly Roger is a live album by heavy metal band Running Wild, released on 24 June 2011 via Golden Core Records. It was recorded and filmed at Wacken on 30 July 2009 for a CD and DVD release. This was known at the time as the "final" show when Rolf Kasparek announced the band's split on 17 April 2009 before reuniting in 2011.

CD track listing

DVD track listing

Extras
 Tour report 1994-1996
 Studio report - "Masquerade" album
 Keep Smiling
 Interviews: April 2009 Part I / Part II / Part III / Wacken 2009

Notes
 "The Brotherhood" and "Draw the Line" were performed at the event, played one after the other between "Raging Fire" and "Whirlwind", but is not included on neither release
 Released as a double CD, separate DVD, deluxe edition with both formats packaged together and on vinyl

Personnel
 Rolf Kasparek - Vocals, Guitars
 Peter Jordan - Guitars 
 Matthias Liebetruth - Drums

Guest Musician
 Jan-Sören Eckert - Bass

Production
 Rolf Kasparek - Producer, Mixing  
 Katharina Nowy - Assistant Producer 
 Thomas Jensen - Executive Producer  
 Marcel Schleiff - Producer  
 Herwig Meyszner - Producer  
 Dirk Illing - Cover Art  
 Nicky Nowy - Mastering

Charts

References

Running Wild (band) albums
2011 live albums